Tsigaba may refer to:

Places in Ethiopia
 Tsigaba, a village in the Haddinnet municipality
 Tsigaba, a village in the Ayninbirkekin municipality

People 
 Tsibabey, Eritrean singer Helen Meles